Kattakampal Temple  is located at Kattakampal village in Thrissur district. The main deity of the temple is Shiva in the Sanctum sanctorum facing east. But temple is famous for Kattakampal Bhagavathy in the separate Sanctum sanctorum facing west. It is believed that this temple is one of the 108 Shiva Temples of Kerala and is installed by sage Parasurama dedicated to Shiva.

According to legends the Kattakampal temple is considered as 2000 years old. Temple is famous for the annual Pooram celebrations (Kattakampal Pooram). The ten days festival finishes on Pooram day (Pooram asterism) in the Malayalam month of Medam (April / May). The major highlight of the pooram festival is the Kali - Darika War and Darika Vadham (killing of the demon Darikasura).

Temple architecture
The temple is situated in Kattakampal village tiny peninsula in Thrissur district. The temple comprises a plot of land about two acres. The temples of Shiva are of great significance when inspecting temple architecture. The over-all temple complex faces west.

See also
 Temples of Kerala

Location
Kattakambal Temple is located at Kattakampal of Kunnamkulam in Thrissur district.

Temple Photos

References

108 Shiva Temples
Shiva temples in Kerala
Devi temples in Kerala
Hindu temples in Thrissur district
ml:കാട്ടകാമ്പൽ ക്ഷേത്രം